Eddie Robinson (born April 13, 1970) is an American football coach and former player.

College career
A native of Louisiana, Robinson was born and raised in New Orleans. He attended Brother Martin High School, graduating in 1988. Robinson furthered his education, attending Alabama State University on an academic scholarship and joining the football team as a walk on. He played as an offensive guard during his first season, but eventually switched to linebacker. He earned a Bachelor's of Science Degree in Chemistry in 1994.
 
Robinson lettered in football all four years and earned All-SWAC honors and SWAC Defensive Player of the Year honors in 1990 and 1991, as well as Sheridan Broadcasting Network All-America honors in 1990 and 1991. Robinson also achieved academic All Conference honors and was recognized as The Toyota Leadership Award recipient in 1990. In 1998, he became the youngest individual to be inducted into the SWAC Hall of Fame at 28 years old, and in 2012 he was recognized as a MEAC/SWAC Challenge Legend.

NFL career
Robinson was the Houston Oilers' second round pick in the 1992 NFL Draft, the 50th player selected.
 
He was a stalwart in the community during his 11-year NFL career, playing with the Houston Oilers (1992–1995), Jacksonville Jaguars (1996–1997), Tennessee Oilers / Titans (1998–2001) and Buffalo Bills (2002), appearing in Super Bowl XXXIV with the Titans in 2000. He finished his career with 805 tackles, 23 sacks, six interceptions and one touchdown.  Robinson received the Titans Unsung Hero award for the Tennessee Titans during his career.  He was the ultimate professional and obtained the knick name "Steady Eddie" for his methodical preparation and on field knowledge of the game, receiving accolades from his coaching staff and teammates for his leadership skills and attention to detail.

Coaching career
On November 26, 2021, Robinson was hired as the head coach for his alma mater Alabama State University.

Other ventures
Robinson retired from the NFL following the 2002 season and entered the business world, and is currently the owner/manager of Magnolia River LLC Real Estate Investment Company.

He was a college football analyst for Fox Sports South, ESPNU, ESPN3 and Comcast Sports South from 2005 until 2014.  In addition he was a co-host on a regionally televised weekly sports show INSIDE SWAC from 2006 to 2009, and continues to broadcast collegiate football games on the radio and appears on sports podcast as a featured guest.

Head coaching record

References

External links
 Alabama State profile

1970 births
Living people
American football linebackers
Alabama State Hornets football coaches
Alabama State Hornets football players
Buffalo Bills players
Houston Oilers players
Jacksonville Jaguars players
Tennessee Oilers players
Tennessee Titans players
Coaches of American football from Louisiana
Players of American football from Louisiana
African-American coaches of American football
African-American players of American football
20th-century African-American sportspeople
21st-century African-American sportspeople